Iskrambol, also known as ice scramble, is a Filipino frozen dessert made from shaved ice with banana extract and evaporated milk with sugar (or condensed milk) It is then topped with a variety of ingredients including powdered milk, marshmallows, strawberry syrup, chocolate syrup, pinipig, tapioca pearls, and sprinkles, among others.  The regular banana extract flavored dessert is characteristically dyed pink while other flavors may be dyed accordingly (e.g. dark brown from the chocolate syrup used in flavoring). 

It is usually sold by street vendors and is a popular dessert among children for its bright colors and inexpensive cost. The name of the dessert is derived from either the method of preparation of the dessert, wherein the ice, milk, and flavoring are mixed usually with a giant egg beater, or on the method of eating the dessert, wherein the ingredients are stirred ("scrambled") with the use of the included straw or spoon.

In terms of taste and color, it is reminiscent and somewhat similar to the Thai Nom Yen, made of Salak syrup.

See also
 Buko salad
 Halo-halo
 Ice buko
 Lamaw
 Sorbetes

References

Philippine desserts
Ice-based desserts